S.O.S. Mulheres ao Mar is a 2014 Brazilian comedy film directed by Cris D'Amato starring Giovanna Antonelli, Reynaldo Gianecchini, Fabíula Nascimento, Thalita Carauta, Marcelo Airoldi and Emanuelle Araújo.

The film follows the story of Adriana, which disappointed with the end of her marriage, decides to win back her ex-husband embarking on the same cruise that he is with his new girlfriend, a soap opera star. The film was shot almost entirely on an ocean liner, but also had scenes shot in Venice.

Plot
Adriana (Giovanna Antonelli) embarks on a cruise to Italy, determined to win back her ex-husband Eduardo (Marcelo Airoldi) who is traveling with a new girlfriend, Beatriz (Emanuelle Araújo), a famous TV star. Adriana takes her sister Luiza (Fabíula Nascimento) and the maid Dialinda (Thalita Carauta), encouraged by the book "SOS - Saving a dream", to ruin the trip of her former husband and win him back. However, during the trip, they meet new people and discover new ways and solutions to their lives.

Cast
 Giovanna Antonelli as Adriana
 Fabíula Nascimento as Luiza
 Thalita Carauta as Dialinda
 Reynaldo Gianecchini as André
 Marcello Airoldi as Eduardo
 Emanuelle Araújo as Beatriz
 Theresa Amayo as Sonia
 Sérgio Muniz as Franco
 Carmine Signorelli as Giorgio
 Flávio Galvão as André's father

References

External links
 

2014 comedy films
2014 films
Brazilian comedy films
Films set on ships
Films shot in Venice
2010s Portuguese-language films